Ivan Gerasimovich Uzlov (born 14 August 1923) is a Soviet and Ukrainian scientist and metallurgist.

External links
http://www.cgntb.dp.ua/menu_224.html 

1923 births
Living people
Place of birth missing (living people)
Soviet metallurgists
Soviet scientists